Mesungulatidae is an extinct clade of meridiolestidan dryolestoid mammals from the Late Cretaceous of South America and possibly other Gondwannan landmasses. They are particularly notable for their ecological speciation and large size.

Characteristics

Most mesungulatids are generally large animals, making them inherently distinctive from other groups. Specific synapomorphies include a strong precingulum and postcingulum on the upper molars - which are extended lingually but do not meet around the paracone - three cusps on the lower stylar shelf, an absent metacone and rectangular lower molars. They are thought to have had a somewhat transverse mastication, like docodonts and modern ungulates. Compared to other dryolestoids their molar eruption patterns are delayed.

Ecology
Mesungulatids are generally large sized herbivores or omnivores, being among the several Mesozoic mammals deviating from the classical insectivore stereotype. They are among the dominant mammals in Late Cretaceous South American assemblages, and among the most derived species present.

References

Dryolestida
Cretaceous mammals of South America
Late Cretaceous first appearances
Late Cretaceous extinctions
Mesozoic mammals of South America
Prehistoric mammal families